Clionitidae is a family of generally evolute, Upper Triassic, ammonoids with a ventral furrow usually bordered by  rows of tubercles and whorl sides ornamented by sigmoidal ribs which  may bear spiral rows of tubercles. The suture is ceratitic.

The Clionitidae belong to the Ceratitida and are included in the superfamily Clydonitoidea. Their fossils have been found in Carnian and/or Norian sediments in California, Nevada British Columbia, the Alps, Balkans, Himalaya, and on Timor.

Among its genera are Clionites, Alloclionites, Californites, and Traskites

References
Treatise on Invertebrate Paleontology, Part L, Ammonoidea. R. C. Moore (ed). Geological Society of America and Univ of Kansas press, 1957

Clydonitaceae
Ceratitida families
Late Triassic first appearances
Late Triassic extinctions
Fossils of Serbia